Dogwood is a common name for trees and shrubs in the temperate Northern Hemisphere genus Cornus.

Dogwood may also refer to:

Other plants
Acacia coriacea, a species in the family Fabaceae native to northern Australia
Acacia bidwillii, a species in the family Fabaceae native to northern Australia
Bedfordia salicina, a species in the family Asteraceae native to Tasmania 
Beilschmiedia oligandra, a species in the family Lauraceae native to Queensland 
Cassinia aculeata, a species in the family Asteraceae native to Tasmania and southeastern Australia 
Ceratopetalum virchowii, a species in the family Cunoniaceae native to Queensland
Eremophila bignoniiflora, a species in the family Scrophulariaceae occurring on floodplains throughout Australia 
Eremophila longifolia, a species in the family Scrophulariaceae native to Australia
Jacksonia scoparia, a species in the family Fabaceae native to eastern Australia
Ozothamnus diosmifolius (white dogwood), a species in the family Asteraceae native to eastern Australia
 Piscidia piscipula, known as Jamaican dogwood, a species in the family Fabaceae native to the Caribbean
Pomaderris apetala, a species in the family Rhamnaceae native to Tasmania  
Pomaderris aspera, a species in the family Rhamnaceae native to southeastern Australia
Pomaderris elliptica (yellow dogwood), a species in the family Rhamnaceae native to southeastern Australia and Tasmania
 Solanum dulcamara, a species of vine in the family Solanaceae native to Europe and Asia

Places
In the United States
Dogwood, Indiana, an unincorporated community
Dogwood, Kentucky, an  unincorporated community
Dogwood, Douglas County, Missouri, an unincorporated community
Dogwood, Mississippi County, Missouri, an unincorporated community

Elsewhere
Dogwood Creek (disambiguation)
Dogwood Point, the southernmost point of Saint Kitts and Nevis

Sports
Dogwood Stakes, an annual American Thoroughbred horse race at Churchill Downs racetrack in Louisville, Kentucky
Miller 500 (Busch race), a NASCAR stock car race held at Martinsville Speedway, in Martinsville, Virginia from 1982 to 1994, known as the Dogwood 500 in the first year
Dogwood Invitational an amateur golf tournament played annually in Atlanta, Georgia

Other
, a US Coast Guard river tender
Forward Operating Base Dogwood, a US military facility in Iraq from 2004 to 2005
Dogwood (band), a Christian punk band
Dogwood (album), self-released in 1998
British Columbia Certificate of Graduation, also known as a Dogwood Diploma or Adult Dogwood, a graduation diploma in British Columbia high schools
Dogwood, the literary journal of Fairfield University
Dogwood, a Virginia news website owned by Courier Newsroom
Dogwood Initiative, a Canadian advocacy group